Purty Rock is a census-designated place (CDP) in McKinley County, New Mexico, United States. It was first listed as a CDP prior to the 2020 census.

The CDP is in the western part of the county, on the south side of the valley of the Puerco River, a west-flowing tributary of the Little Colorado River. The CDP includes the unincorporated community of Defiance along a former alignment of U.S. Route 66. Interstate 40 passes through the CDP, with access from Exit 16,  to the east, or from Exit 8,  to the southwest.

Demographics

Education
It is in Gallup-McKinley County Public Schools.

Zoned schools are: Tobe Turpen Elementary School, Chief Manualito Middle School, and Gallup High School.

References 

Census-designated places in McKinley County, New Mexico
Census-designated places in New Mexico